The Apostolic Nunciature to Palau is an ecclesiastical office of the Catholic Church in Palau. It is a diplomatic post of the Holy See, whose representative is called the Apostolic Nuncio with the rank of an ambassador. The nuncio resides in Wellington, New Zealand.

List of papal representatives to Palau 
Apostolic Nuncio 
Patrick Coveney (14 July 2001 - 25 January 2005)
Charles Daniel Balvo (1 April 2005 - 17 January 2013)
Martin Krebs (8 May 2013 - 16 June 2018)
Novatus Rugambwa (25 May 2019 – present)

References

Palau